Christopher Mark Eddy (born November 27, 1969) is an American former Major League Baseball pitcher. He threw and batted left-handed.

Biography 
Eddy attended Duncanville High School in Duncanville, Texas, and Texas Christian University.

He was drafted by the Kansas City Royals in the third round (78th overall) of the 1992 Major League Baseball Draft. He was selected by the Oakland Athletics from the Royals in the 1994 Rule 5 draft. After appearing in six games with the Athletics, he was returned to the Royals, never again pitching in the majors.

, Eddy works as the Athletic Director for the Charter School of Wilmington in Delaware. He has been in this position since May 2009.

References

External links

1969 births
Living people
TCU Horned Frogs baseball players
Eugene Emeralds players
Wilmington Blue Rocks players
Memphis Chicks players
Omaha Royals players
Oakland Athletics players
Wichita Wranglers players
New Orleans Zephyrs players
Tulsa Drillers players
Atlantic City Surf players
Baseball players from Dallas
Duncanville High School alumni